Wilstrop railway station served Wilstrop and Skipbridge, North Yorkshire, England from 1865 to 1964 on the Harrogate line.

History 
The station opened in June 1865 by the North Eastern Railway. The station was situated at the level crossing on a lane off the A59. A goods siding was installed southeast of the level crossing, complete with a shelter over the track. There was no lighting at the platforms due to the trains calling at the station in daylight hours no matter what season it was, so lighting was unnecessary. The last passenger train called at the station on 25 April 1931 but the station formally closed to passengers on 1 May 1931. The station closed to goods traffic on 4 May 1964.

References

External links 

Disused railway stations in North Yorkshire
Former North Eastern Railway (UK) stations
Railway stations in Great Britain opened in 1865
Railway stations in Great Britain closed in 1931
1865 establishments in England
1964 disestablishments in England